Mukhtar Ahmed (born 20 December 1992) is a Pakistani cricketer, who plays domestic cricket for Southern Punjab.

Domestic career
He was the leading run-scorer for Rawalpindi in the 2018–19 Quaid-e-Azam One Day Cup, with 434 runs in seven matches.

International career
He made his Twenty20 International debut for Pakistan against Bangladesh on 24 April 2015. His first T20 international fifty came in his second match against Zimbabwe in Lahore on 22 May 2015. For this innings he was named man of the match. Two days later in the second match of two in the series, he once again scored a fifty and was named man of the match, and finally won the player of the series award as well.

References

External links
 

1992 births
Living people
Pakistani cricketers
Pakistan Twenty20 International cricketers
State Bank of Pakistan cricketers
Sialkot Stallions cricketers
Cricketers from Sialkot
Khyber Pakhtunkhwa cricketers
Comilla Victorians cricketers
Rawalpindi cricketers
Karachi Kings cricketers
Southern Punjab (Pakistan) cricketers